Du Ruisseau is a future Réseau express métropolitain (REM) station in Montreal, Quebec, Canada, expected to open for REM service by the end of 2024. It was formerly a commuter rail station on the Deux-Montagnes line until Exo ended service in 2020.

Origin of name
Du Ruisseau takes its name from nearby Boulevard Du Ruisseau, located in the heart of the subdivision.

Prior to the modernization of the Deux-Montagnes Line, between 1993 and 1995, this area was served by the now defunct Monkland station, located some  further west at the O'Brien Avenue level crossing. It was intended that Line 2 be extended at this end. The proposed Bois-Franc metro station could have been intermodal with the former Monkland station.

Location
The station is located at 3735 Henri-Bourassa Boulevard West, between Jules-Poitras Boulevard and Dutrisac Street, just west of Autoroute 15 exit # 3 in Saint-Laurent on the border with Cartierville. It is located about one kilometre from the Bois-de-Boulogne station on the Saint-Jérôme line.

Connecting bus routes

References

External links

 Du Ruisseau Commuter Train Station Information (RTM)
 Du Ruisseau Commuter Train Station Schedule (RTM)
 2016 STM System Map
 STL 2011 map

Former Exo commuter rail stations
Railway stations in Montreal
Saint-Laurent, Quebec
Réseau express métropolitain railway stations